Jessica Aguilar (born May 8, 1982) is a Mexican-American mixed martial artist who competes in RIZIN. At the time of her voluntary departure from World Series of Fighting, she was the reigning WSOF Women's Strawweight Champion. Aguilar previously competed for Bellator Fighting Championships and  Ultimate Fighting Championship.

Mixed martial arts career 
Aguilar made her professional mixed martial arts debut on February 18, 2006 at Absolute Fighting Championships 15. She faced Lisa Ellis and was defeated by submission due to a rear-naked choke in the second round.

On February 17, 2007, Aguilar faced Japanese pro wrestler Sumie Sakai at Combat Fighting Championship 3. She defeated Sakai by unanimous decision.

Aguilar faced Valerie Coolbaugh on March 5, 2010 at Action Fight League: Rock-N-Rumble 2. She defeated Coolbaugh by submission due to a triangle choke in the second round.

Aguilar returned to Action Fight League on June 4, 2010 at Rock-N-Rumble 3. She defeated Catia Vitoria by TKO in the first round.

On June 23, 2010, Bellator Fighting Championships announced that Aguilar had signed on to take part in the promotion's 115 lbs women's tournament.

Aguilar made her Bellator debut at Bellator 24 on August 12, 2010. She defeated Lynn Alvarez by submission due to an arm-triangle choke in the first round to advance to the semi-finals of the Bellator tournament.

On September 30, 2010, Aguilar faced Zoila Frausto Gurgel at Bellator 31. She was defeated by a controversial split decision, having dominated most of the match.

Aguilar was scheduled to make her Jewels debut in Japan on March 11, 2011 against Ayaka Hamasaki, but the event was cancelled due to the 2011 Tōhoku earthquake and tsunami.

On June 25, 2011, Aguilar returned to Bellator and faced Carla Esparza at Bellator 46. She defeated Esparza by split decision.

Aguilar agreed to rematch Zoila Frausto Gurgel in a non-title bout at a Bellator event in late October. However, she withdrew from the planned fight due to a prolonged recovery from foot surgery after her June win over Esparza.

Aguilar faced Lisa Ellis in a rematch at Bellator 58 on November 19, 2011. She missed weight for the fight, but won by unanimous decision.

Aguilar next faced Patricia Vidonic at Fight Time Promotions 8 on February 17, 2012. She defeated Vidonic by unanimous decision.

Aguilar returned to Bellator to face Megumi Fujii at Bellator 69 on May 18, 2012. She defeated Fujii by unanimous decision.

On March 28, 2013, Aguilar faced Patricia Vidonic in a rematch at Bellator 94. She won the back-and-forth fight via split decision.

Along with Jessica Eye, Aguilar was released by Bellator on August 13, 2013. Aguilar and Eye were the last remaining female fighters on the Bellator roster.

Aguilar faced Megumi Fujii in a rematch at Vale Tudo Japan 3rd on October 5, 2013 in Tokyo, Japan. Aguilar initially won by TKO when the doctor stopped the fight after round two due to a Fujii eye injury that was caused by two accidental eye pokes. The result of the fight was later changed to a technical majority decision win for Aguilar.

World Series of Fighting 
It was announced on November 11, 2013 that Aguilar had signed with World Series of Fighting, becoming the first female fighter to sign with the promotion.

WSOF Women's Strawweight Championship
Aguilar made her WSOF debut on January 18, 2014 as she faced Alida Gray at WSOF 8 for the WSOF Women's Strawweight Championship. She won the fight via submission in the first round to become the promotion's first female champion.

In her first title defense, Aguilar faced Emi Fujino on June 21, 2014 at WSOF 10. She won the fight via unanimous decision.

Aguilar made her second title defense against Kalindra Faria on November 15, 2014 at WSOF 15. She again was victorious via unanimous decision.

On May 18, 2015 Aguilar was granted her release from WSOF, to pursue fighting in the UFC.

Ultimate Fighting Championship 
On June 11, 2015, it was announced that Aguilar officially signed with the Ultimate Fighting Championship (UFC). She made her debut against Cláudia Gadelha on August 1, 2015 at UFC 190. She lost the fight by unanimous decision.

Aguilar's next bout was expected to be against Juliana Lima at UFC 197. However, on March 18 she revealed that she had torn her ACL and that it would require surgery; she would subsequently be replaced by Carla Esparza.

Aguilar next faced Cortney Casey at UFC 211 on May 13, 2017. She lost the fight via unanimous decision. However, the result of the fight was overturned to a No Contest after an in-competition drug test by Casey tested positive for elevated levels of testosterone. In turn, on June 30, the TDLR lifted Casey's three-month suspension and gave back her victory, which was overturned to a no contest.

Aguilar was scheduled to face Livia Renata Souza on February 18, 2018 at UFC Fight Night: Cowboy vs. Medeiros. However, Souza pulled out on February 10 due to a hand injury and the bout was scrapped.

Aguilar was scheduled to face Jodie Esquibel on June 1, 2018 at UFC Fight Night 131. Aguilar successfully weighed in, but the bout was removed from the card the day of the event by the NYSAC due to a concern over a medical issue with Aguilar.  The pair eventually faced each other at UFC Fight Night 133 on July 14, 2018. Aguilar won the fight by unanimous decision.

Aguilar faced Zhang Weili on November 24, 2018 at UFC Fight Night 141. She lost the fight via submission in round one.

Aguilar faced Marina Rodriguez on March 30, 2019 at UFC on ESPN 2. She lost the fight via unanimous decision.

On May 16, 2019 it was reported that Aguilar was released by UFC.

Xtreme Fighting Championships 
On October 5, 2020 it was announced that Aguilar signed with Xtreme Fighting Championships and would make her debut in November 2020. Later, it was announced that Aguilar would make her promotional debut against Danielle Taylor at XFC 43 on November 11, 2020. She lost the fight via split decision.

Rizin FF
In July 2022 it was revealed that Aguilar would participate Rizin FF 2022 Super Atomweight Grand Prix and would face Ayaka Hamasaki in the quarterfinals at Rizin 37 on July 31, 2022.

Personal life 
Outside of mixed martial arts, Aguilar currently manages franchise development for the Boca Tanning Club chain in Florida. She is openly lesbian and is dating actress Shalita Grant as of 2020.

Championships and accomplishments

Mixed martial arts 
Bellator Fighting Championships
Bellator Season 3 Women's 115 lbs Tournament Semi-finalist
Women's MMA Awards
2011 Female Flyweight of the Year
2010 Female Fan Favorite of the Year
2012 Florida MMA Female Fighter of the Year
World Series of Fighting
WSOF Women's Strawweight Championship (First; One time)
Two successful title defenses

Submission grappling 
International Federation of Associated Wrestling Styles
FILA 2010 Grappling World Championships Women's Senior No-Gi Gold Medalist
FILA 2009 Grappling World Championships Women's Senior Gi Bronze Medalist
FILA 2009 Grappling World Championships Women's Senior No-Gi Gold Medalist

Mixed martial arts record 

|-
|Loss
|align=center|20–10
|Ayaka Hamasaki
|Decision (unanimous)
|Rizin 37
|
|align=center|3
|align=center|5:00
|Saitama, Japan
|
|-
|Loss
|align=center|20–9
|Danielle Taylor
|Decision (split)
|XFC 43
|
|align=center|3
|align=center|5:00
|Atlanta, Georgia, United States
|
|-
|Loss
|align=center|20–8
|Marina Rodriguez
|Decision (unanimous)
|UFC on ESPN: Barboza vs. Gaethje
|
|align=center|3
|align=center|5:00
|Philadelphia, Pennsylvania, United States
|
|-
|Loss
|align=center|20–7
|Zhang Weili
|Submission (armbar)
|UFC Fight Night: Blaydes vs. Ngannou 2
|
|align=center|1
|align=center|3:41
|Beijing, China
|
|-
|Win
|align=center|20–6
|Jodie Esquibel
|Decision (unanimous)
|UFC Fight Night: dos Santos vs. Ivanov
|
|align=center|3
|align=center|5:00
|Boise, Idaho, United States
|
|-
|Loss
|align=center|19–6
|Cortney Casey
|Decision (unanimous)
|UFC 211
|
|align=center|3
|align=center|5:00
|Dallas, Texas, United States
|
|-
|Loss
|align=center|19–5
|Cláudia Gadelha
|Decision (unanimous)
|UFC 190
|
|align=center|3
|align=center|5:00
|Rio de Janeiro, Brazil
|
|-
|Win
|align=center| 19–4
|Kalindra Faria
|Decision (unanimous)
|WSOF 15
|
|align=center| 5
|align=center| 5:00
|Tampa, Florida, United States
|
|-
|Win
|align=center| 18–4
|Emi Fujino
|Decision (unanimous)
|WSOF 10
|
|align=center| 5
|align=center| 5:00
|Las Vegas, Nevada, United States
|
|-
| Win
|align=center| 17–4
|Alida Gray
|Submission (arm-triangle choke)
|WSOF 8
|
|align=center|1
|align=center|2:45
|Hollywood, Florida, United States
|
|-
| Win
|align=center| 16–4
|Megumi Fujii
|Technical decision (majority)
|Vale Tudo Japan 3rd
|
|align=center| 2
|align=center| 5:00
|Tokyo, Japan
|
|-
|Win
|align=center| 15–4
|Patricia Vidonic
|Decision (split)
|Bellator 94
|
|align=center| 3
|align=center| 5:00
|Tampa, Florida, United States
|
|-
|Win
|align=center| 14–4
|Megumi Fujii
|Decision (unanimous)
|Bellator 69
|
|align=center| 3
|align=center| 5:00
|Lake Charles, Louisiana, United States
|
|-
|Win
|align=center| 13–4
|Patricia Vidonic
|Decision (unanimous)
|Fight Time Promotions 8
|
|align=center| 3
|align=center| 5:00
|Fort Lauderdale, Florida, United States
|
|-
|Win
|align=center| 12–4
|Lisa Ellis
|Decision (unanimous)
|Bellator 58
|
|align=center| 3
|align=center| 5:00
|Hollywood, Florida, United States
|
|-
|Win
|align=center| 11–4
|Carla Esparza
|Decision (split)
|Bellator 46
|
|align=center| 3
|align=center| 5:00
|Hollywood, Florida, United States
|
|-
|Win
|align=center| 10–4
|Elsie Henri
|Submission (armbar)
|G-Force Fights: Bad Blood 4
|
|align=center| 1
|align=center| 1:22
|Coral Gables, Florida, United States
|
|-
|Loss
|align=center| 9–4
|Zoila Frausto
|Decision (split)
|Bellator 31
|
|align=center| 3
|align=center| 5:00
|Lake Charles, Louisiana, United States
|
|-
|Win
|align=center| 9–3
|Lynn Alvarez
|Submission (arm-triangle choke)
|Bellator 24
|
|align=center| 1
|align=center| 4:01
|Hollywood, Florida, United States
|
|-
|Win
|align=center| 8–3
|Catia Vitoria
|TKO (punches)
|Action Fight League: Rock-N-Rumble 3
|
|align=center| 1
|align=center| 4:17
|Hollywood, Florida, United States
|
|-
|Win
|align=center| 7–3
|Valerie Coolbaugh
|Submission (triangle choke)
|Action Fight League: Rock-N-Rumble 2
|
|align=center| 2
|align=center| 3:28
|Hollywood, Florida, United States
|
|-
|Win
|align=center| 6–3
|Amanda Duvall
|Submission (arm-triangle choke)
|Unconquered 1: November Reign
|
|align=center| 2
|align=center| 1:32
|Coral Gables, Florida, United States
|
|-
| Loss
|align=center| 5–3
|Angela Magaña
|Decision (majority)
|HOOKnSHOOT: GFight 2009 Grand Prix
|
|align=center| 3
|align=center| 3:00
|Evansville, Indiana, United States
|
|-
|Win
|align=center| 5–2
|Angela Magaña
|Technical submission (blood in the eye)
|WFC 6: Battle in the Bay
|
|align=center| 3
|align=center| 1:53
|Tampa, Florida, United States
|Magaña tried to signal to the referee that Aguilar was bleeding into her eye and the referee mistook this for a verbal submission.
|-
|Loss
|align=center| 4–2
|Carina Damm
|Decision (unanimous)
|BodogFight: Vancouver
|
|align=center| 3
|align=center| 5:00
|Vancouver, British Columbia, Canada
|
|-
|Win
|align=center| 4–1
|Angela Magaña
|Submission (armbar)
|WFC 3: Turf Wars
|
|align=center| 1
|align=center| 3:09
|Tampa, Florida, United States
|
|-
|Win
|align=center| 3–1
|Sumie Sakai
|Decision (unanimous)
|Combat Fighting Championship 3
|
|align=center| 3
|align=center| 5:00
|Orlando, Florida, United States
|
|-
|Win
|align=center| 2–1
|Tamera Arnold
|Submission (guillotine choke)
|Combat Fighting Championship 2
|
|align=center| 2
|align=center| 4:40
|Orlando, Florida, United States
|
|-
|Win
|align=center| 1–1
|Lindsay Ketchum
|TKO (corner stoppage)
|Combat Fighting Championship 1
|
|align=center| 1
|align=center| 5:00
|Orlando, Florida, United States
|
|-
|Loss
|align=center| 0–1
|Lisa Ellis
|Submission (rear-naked choke)
|Absolute Fighting Championships 15
|
|align=center| 2
|align=center| 2:53
|Fort Lauderdale, Florida, United States
|
|-

See also 
 List of female mixed martial artists

References

External links 
 
 

1982 births
American female mixed martial artists
Mexican female mixed martial artists
American mixed martial artists of Mexican descent
American practitioners of Brazilian jiu-jitsu
Female Brazilian jiu-jitsu practitioners
American LGBT sportspeople
LGBT mixed martial artists
Mexican LGBT sportspeople
LGBT Hispanic and Latino American people
Living people
Mexican emigrants to the United States
Strawweight mixed martial artists
Mixed martial artists utilizing Brazilian jiu-jitsu
People from Poza Rica
Sportspeople from Veracruz
People from Coconut Creek, Florida
Mexican practitioners of Brazilian jiu-jitsu
Ultimate Fighting Championship female fighters
Lesbian sportswomen
LGBT Brazilian jiu-jitsu practitioners
21st-century American women
Sportspeople from Broward County, Florida